Providence may refer to the following places in North Carolina:
Providence, Caswell County, North Carolina
Providence, Granville County, North Carolina
Providence, McDowell County, North Carolina
Providence, Mecklenburg County, North Carolina
Providence, Rockingham County, North Carolina
Providence Township, Rowan County, North Carolina